Rostki may refer to the following places:
Rostki (Ostrołęka County) in Masovian Voivodeship (east-central Poland)
Rostki, Kolno County in Podlaskie Voivodeship (north-east Poland)
Rostki, Łomża County in Podlaskie Voivodeship (north-east Poland)
Rostki, Maków County in Masovian Voivodeship (east-central Poland)
Rostki, Płońsk County in Masovian Voivodeship (east-central Poland)
Rostki, Węgrów County in Masovian Voivodeship (east-central Poland)
Rostki, Giżycko County in Warmian-Masurian Voivodeship (north Poland)
Rostki, Pisz County in Warmian-Masurian Voivodeship (north Poland)